The following is a list of awards and nominations received by the American comedian and filmmaker Elaine May.

May is an American comedian, writer, director, producer and actor who is known for her work on film, television and theatre. She started her career as a improvisational comedian with Mike Nichols during the 1960s. Together, they performed onstage from clubs in Greenwich Village to the Broadway stage. They released multiple comedy albums, receiving four Grammy Award nominations and winning the Best Comedy Album award in 1962 for An Evening with Mike Nichols and Elaine May. For her work on film, she has received two Academy Award nominations for Best Adapted Screenplay for her work on Warren Beatty's Heaven Can Wait (1978) and Mike Nichols' Primary Colors (1998). She received an Academy Honorary Award in 2021. For her work on the Broadway stage, she received a Tony Award for Best Actress in a Play and a Drama Desk Award for Outstanding Actress in a Play for Kenneth Lonergan's revival of The Waverly Gallery in 2019.

Major associations

Academy Awards

Grammy Awards

Tony Awards

Industry awards

British Academy Film Awards

Golden Globe Awards

Writers Guild of America

Critics awards

National Society of Film Critics

Los Angeles Film Critics Association

Theatre awards

Drama Desk Award

Drama League Award

Outer Critics Circle Award

References 

May, Elaine